Gourdon is a railway station in Gourdon, Occitanie, France. The station is on the Orléans–Montauban railway line. The station is served by Corail Lunéa (night train), Téoz (Intercity) and TER (local) services operated by SNCF.

Train services
The following services call at Gourdon:
intercity services (Intercités) Paris–Vierzon–Limoges–Toulouse
night services (Intercités de nuit) Paris–Orléans–Souillac–Toulouse
local service (TER Occitanie) Brive-la-Gaillarde–Cahors–Montauban–Toulouse

References

Railway stations in Lot (department)